Marc Beckers (born 19 October 1973) is a former German footballer.

Beckers made two appearances for Borussia Mönchengladbach in the Bundesliga during his playing career.

References

External links 
 

1973 births
Living people
German footballers
Association football defenders
Bundesliga players
2. Bundesliga players
Borussia Mönchengladbach players
Fortuna Düsseldorf players